The Pump Branch is a  tributary of Albertson Brook in southern New Jersey in the United States.

The Pump Branch arises at Virginia Lake in Winslow, flows under and along the former Atlantic City Railroad main line to the hamlet of Cedar Brook, where it turns east and is dammed to form Hobb Lake, in the vicinity of Bates Mill. Just downstream is another series of dams and lakes, built for the summer camp, Camp Haluwasa. Passing through Ancora, it joins with Blue Anchor Brook to form Albertson Brook.

See also
List of rivers of New Jersey

References

External links
U.S. Geological Survey: NJ stream gaging stations

Tributaries of the Mullica River
Rivers of New Jersey
Rivers of Camden County, New Jersey